Edwin Alberto Herrera Hernandez (born 2 September 1998) is a Colombian footballer who plays as a right or left back for Santa Fe.

Career statistics

Club

Notes

References

1998 births
Living people
Colombian footballers
Colombian expatriate footballers
Association football defenders
Independiente Santa Fe footballers
F.C. Famalicão players
Categoría Primera A players
Primeira Liga players
Colombian expatriate sportspeople in Portugal
Expatriate footballers in Portugal
Sportspeople from Cartagena, Colombia